Taió is a municipality in the state of Santa Catarina in the South region of Brazil.

Sister City
  Zhoukou, Henan, China

See also
List of municipalities in Santa Catarina

References

Municipalities in Santa Catarina (state)